Kola is an island in the Aru Islands in the Arafura Sea. It is situated in the Maluku Province, Indonesia. The other five main islands in the archipelago are Tanahbesar (also called Wokam), Kobroor, Maikoor, Koba, and Trangan.

The Kola language is spoken on the island.

References 

Aru Islands
Islands of the Maluku Islands